Mia Svele (born 16 April 2001) is a Norwegian handball player for Nykøbing Falster Håndboldklub.

She is a daughter of former handballer and handball commentator Bent Svele.

She also participated at the 2018 Women's Youth World Handball Championship, placing 11th.

Achievements 
Norwegian League
Silver Medalist: 2018/2019, 2019/2020 
Bronze Medalist: 2017/2018
Norwegian Cup:
Finalist: 2018, 2019

References

2001 births
Living people
People from Ringsaker
Norwegian female handball players
Nykøbing Falster Håndboldklub players
Sportspeople from Innlandet